This is a list of chapters for Alpha Omicron Pi International sorority.



Collegiate chapters

Date conventions
A single date shown means this is the year that chapter was founded. Where two dates are shown, hyphenated, for example "1983-1993", this indicates the active dates of a chapter that has been subsequently closed.  Where three dates are shown, for example "1934-1969/ 1989", this means the chapter was active between 1934 and 1969, closed, but was then re-chartered in 1989, with a continuing active presence today. In the case of four dates, "1959-1981 / 1989-1996", the chapter began in 1959, closed in 1981, reopened in 1989 and closed again in 1996.

Except where otherwise noted, chapter names, schools and dates are from the international sorority's website.

Canada

United States

Notes

Alumnae chapters
Alabama
 Birmingham Alumnae
 Greater Gadsden Alumnae
 Huntsville Alumnae
 Mobile Alumnae
 Montgomery Alumnae
 Tuscaloosa Alumnae

Alaska
 Alaska Alumnae

Arizona
 Phoenix Alumnae
 Tucson Alumnae

Arkansas
 Jonesboro Alumnae
 Little Rock Area Alumnae
 Northeast Oklahoma/Northwest Arkansas Alumnae

California
 East Bay Alumnae
 Greater Los Angeles Alumnae
 Greater Sacramento Valley Alumnae
 Long Beach Alumnae
 North Bay Alumnae
 Northern Orange Co. Alumnae
 Palo Alto Alumnae
 San Diego Alumnae
 San Fernando Valley Alumnae
 San Gabriel Valley Alumnae
 San Jose Alumnae
 San Mateo Alumnae
 Santa Barbara Alumnae
 South Bay/Palos Verdes Alumnae
 Southern Orange County Alumnae
 Ventura County Alumnae

Colorado
 Denver Alumnae
 Rocky Mountain Alumnae

Connecticut
 Central Connecticut Alumnae

Delaware
 Delaware Alumnae

Florida
 Fort Lauderdale Alumnae
 Greater Lee County Alumnae
 Greater Miami Alumnae
 Greater Pensacola Alumnae
 Greater Pinellas Alumnae
 Orlando Area Alumnae
 Palm Beach County Alumnae
 Sarasota Area Alumnae
 Tampa Bay Alumnae

Georgia
 Athens Alumnae
 Atlanta Alumnae
 Middle Georgia Alumnae
 Savannah Alumnae

Idaho
 Pocatello Alumnae

Illinois
 Bloomington-Normal Alumnae
 Champaign-Urbana Alumnae
 Chicago City Alumnae
 Chicago North Shore Alumnae
 Chicago NW Suburban Alumnae
 Chicago South Suburban Alumnae
 Chicago West Suburban Alumnae
 DeKalb-Kane Alumnae
 Lake County of Ill Alumnae

Indiana
 Bloomington Alumnae
 Evansville Tri-State Alumnae
 Indianapolis Alumnae
 Muncie Alumnae
 Terre Haute Alumnae

Kansas
 No Alumnae Chapters

Kentucky
 Bowling Green Alumnae
 Central Kentucky Bluegrass Alumnae
 Kentuckiana Alumnae
 Kentucky Lakes Alumnae
 Lexington Alumnae
 Northern Kentucky Alumnae

Louisiana
 Acadiana Alumnae
 Baton Rouge Alumnae
 Hammond Area Alumnae
 Monroe Alumnae
 New Orleans Area Alumnae
 Shreveport Area Alumnae

Maine
 Greater Portland Alumnae

Maryland
 Baltimore Alumnae
 Suburban Maryland Alumnae

Massachusetts
 Boston Alumnae

Michigan
 Ann Arbor Alumnae
 Dearborn Alumnae
 Detroit N Suburban Alumnae
 Grand Rapids Alumnae
 Macomb County Alumnae

Minnesota
 Minneapolis/St. Paul Alumnae

Mississippi
 Greater Jackson Alumnae

Missouri
 Greater Kansas City Alumnae
 Mid Missouri Alumnae
 St. Louis Alumnae

Montana
 Bozeman Alumnae

Nebraska
 Kearney Alumnae
 Lincoln Alumnae
 Omaha Alumnae

Nevada
 Las Vegas Alumnae
 Reno/Tahoe Alumnae

New Jersey
 Central New Jersey Alumnae
 Jersey Shore Alumnae
 Northern New Jersey Alumnae

New Mexico
 Central New Mexico Alumnae

New York
 Buffalo Alumnae
 Long Island Alumnae
 New York Capital Region Alumnae
 New York City Area Alumnae
 NY/NJ Metro Alumnae
 Rochester Alumnae

North Carolina
 Charlotte Alumnae
 Greater Greenville Alumnae
 North Carolina Foothills Alumnae
 Piedmont, NC Alumnae
 Triangle Alumnae
 Southport Alumnae
 Winston-Salem Alumnae

Ohio
 Cincinnati Alumnae
 Cleveland Area Alumnae
 Cleveland West Alumnae
 Columbus Alumnae
 Dayton Alumnae
 Mahoning Valley Alumnae
 Toledo Area Alumnae

Oklahoma
 Tulsa Alumnae
 Oklahoma City Alumnae

Oregon
 Portland Alumnae

Pennsylvania
 Bucks County Alumnae
 Greater Erie Alumnae
 Greater Harrisburg Alumnae
 Lehigh Valley Alumnae
 Philadelphia Alumnae
 State College Alumnae

South Carolina
 Charleston Alumnae

Tennessee
 Chattanooga Alumnae
 Knoxville Alumnae
 Memphis Area Alumnae
 Nashville Area Alumnae

Texas
 Austin Alumnae
 Dallas Alumnae
 Denton County Alumnae
 El Paso Alumnae
 Houston Alumnae
 San Antonio Alumnae

Utah
 Salt Lake City Alumnae

Virginia
 Northern Virginia Alumnae
 Richmond Area Alumnae
 Virginia Tidewater Alumnae
 Williamsburg Alumnae

Washington
 Palouse Area Alumnae
 Seattle Alumnae

Wisconsin
 Madison Alumnae
 Milwaukee Alumnae

Canada
 Calgary Alumnae
 Greater Vancouver Region Alumnae
 Ottawa Alumnae
 Southwestern Ontario Alumnae
 Toronto Area Alumnae
 Montreal Alumnae

References

Alpha Omicron Pi
chapters